Communication is the debut album by the Jazz Composer's Orchestra featuring compositions by Michael Mantler and Carla Bley performed by Paul Bley, Steve Lacy, Jimmy Lyons, Roswell Rudd, Archie Shepp, John Tchicai, Fred Pirtle, Willie Ruff, Ken McIntyre, Robin Kenyatta, Bob Carducci, Kent Carter, Steve Swallow, Milford Graves, and Barry Altschul. The album was released on the Fontana label in 1965. AllMusic described it as "one of the masterpieces of creative music in the '60s".

Track listing 
 "Roast" (Carla Bley) - 11:49
 "Day (Communications No. 4)" (Michael Mantler) - 2:25
 "Day (Communications No. 5)" (Michael Mantler) - 24:55
Recorded at Judson Hall, New York City, December 29, 1964 (track 1) and the Contemporary Center, New York City, April 10, 1965 (tracks 2 & 3).

Personnel 
Michael Mantler - trumpet
Roswell Rudd - trombone
Steve Lacy soprano saxophone
Jimmy Lyons - alto saxophone
Fred Pirtle baritone saxophone
Paul Bley - piano
Willie Ruff - french horn (track 1)
John Tchicai - alto saxophone (track 1)
Archie Shepp - tenor saxophone (track 1)
Eddie Gómez - bass (track 1)
Milford Graves - drums (track 1)
Ray Codrington - trumpet (tracks 2 & 3)
Robin Kenyatta, Ken McIntyre - alto saxophone (tracks 2 & 3)
Bob Carducci - tenor saxophone (tracks 2 & 3)
Kent Carter, Steve Swallow - bass (tracks 2 & 3)
Barry Altschul - drums (tracks 2 & 3)

References 

Jazz Composer's Orchestra albums
1965 live albums
Fontana Records live albums